Daniel Denton (born November 14, 1973), better known by his stage name Moka Only, is a Canadian underground hip hop artist. He has won 3 JUNO Awards, 5 MuchMusic Video Awards, and has been nominated for 11 Western Canadian Music Awards.

Originally from Langford, British Columbia, near Victoria, he is now based in Vancouver. He was previously part of the hip hop group Swollen Members, and briefly a part of Len. Moka has released albums through Feelin' Music, Legendary Entertainment, Battleaxe Records, Domination Recordings, Camobear Records, Wandering Worx and URBNET Records. Moka Only often works with different hip-hop artists and groups, and often works under his alias Ron Contour.

In October 2018, Moka Only announced via Instagram that he would be retiring from rapping. However, he soon returned, claiming he would be focusing on more jazz and instrumentals, in addition to rapping.

In 2020, a collaboration with Christopher Esx, titled Easy Street, was released. At the end of 2020, Moka released the EP Microphone Deflection under the alias Tank Gawd, produced by Kutmasta Kurt, and featuring appearances by Kool Keith and Del The Funky Homosapien

Discography

Studio albums 
 Upcoast Relix (1995)
 Dusty Bumps (1996)
 Durable Mammal (1997)
 Fall Collection 97 (1997)
 Apenuts (1998)
 Monsterpiece (1998)
 Mount Unpleasant (1999)
 Mr. Behaviour (1999)
 Everyday Details (1999)
 Beauty Is a Free Road (2000)
 Flowtorch (2001)
 She ran away to Mexico to join a circus (2001)
 Mokefluenza (2001)
 The Quick Hits (2001)
 Road Life (2001)
 Moka Only Is.... Ron Contour (2001)
 Lime Green (2001)
 Flood (2002)
 Lowdown Suite (2003)
 Martian Xmas 2004 (2004)
 The Desired Effect (2005)
 Desired Effect (2006)
 Dirty Jazz (2006)
 The Creepee Eepee (2006)
 The Station Agent (2006)
 Airport (2007)
 Vermillion (2007)
 Moka Only vs Numata (2007) (with Atsushi Numata)
 Dog River (2007) (with Def 3)
 Martian Xmas 2006 (2007)
 Martian Xmas 2007 (2007)
 Airport 2 (2008)
 Clap Trap (2008)
Fall Collection 2005 (2008)
 Hotdog (2008)
 Psychodelic (2008)
 Carrots and Eggs (2008)
 Martian Xmas 2008 (2009)
 Lowdown Suite 2...The Box (2009)
 Airport 3 (2009)
 The Summer of Ron (2009)
 The Beach (2009)
 Summer Notations (2009) (with Nebz Supreme)
 Martian Xmas 2009 (2009)
 Saffron (2010) (with Factor)
 Rontario (2010)
 Airport 4 (2010)
 Dynamite Sandwich (2010) (with E.D.G.E.)
 Martian Xmas 2010 (2010)
 Airport 5 (2011)
 Barbecued Horse Contest (2011)
 Longmile Buggedness (2011)
 Martian Xmas 2011 (2011)
 Crickets (2011) (with Chief)
 Bridges (2012) (with Ayatollah)
 Airport 6 (2012)
 Martian Xmas 2012 (2012)
 Doctor Do Much Mixtape (2013)
 Mutant Mixtape (2013)
 Vintage Beats 2002 vol. 1 (2013)
 Martian Xmas 2013 (2013)
 Sex, Money, Moka (2014)
 Martian Xmas 2014 (2014)
 California Sessions Volume 1 (unreleased 2003) (2015)
 California Sessions Volume 2 (unreleased 2003) (2015)
 Chicken Wingz (2015)
 Magickal Weirdness (2015)
 Martian Xmas 2015 (2015)
 Martian Xmas 2005 (2015)
 Brutal (2016)
 São Paulo (2016)
 Re-Bent Twisted and Gnarled (2016)
 I'm Delighted (2016)
 Presents Malkin Jackson - Summerland (2016)
 #99 (2016)
 California Sessions Volume 3 (unreleased 2003) (2016)
 Milky State (2016)
 Martian Xmas 2016 (2016)
 To the Next Season (2016)
 Concert for One (2017)
 Martian Xmas 2017 (2017)
 Concert for One (Instrumentals) (2018)
Martian Xmas 2018 (2018)
Patina (2019)
Patina (Instrumentals) (2019)
Martian 2019 (2019)
It Can Do (2020)
She ran away to Mexico to join the circus (2001) (2020)
It Can Do (Instrumentals) (2020)
Martian 2020 (2020)
Martian Xmas 2021 (2021)
Summer 2002, Volume 1 (2022)
Summer 2002, Volume 2 (2022)
Martian Xmas 2022 (2022)

EPs
 The Crystal Senate (1997) (with Sixtoo)
 Imagine Me (2000)
 Where's My Honey (2003) (with Wicked Lester)
 The Honey EP (2006) (with Wicked Lester)
 Creepee Eepee 2 (2007)
 EP (2008) (with DJ Motive)
 Run & Find EP (2008)
 Do Work (2009)
 Isn't Over EP (2010)
 Crickets Remixes Part 1 (2011)
 Crickets Remixes Part 2 (2011)
 Vibes EP (2017) (with Reckonize Real)
Myopic Bubble (2018)
Myopic Bubble (Instrumentals) (2018)

Singles

 "Live from Rio" (2000)
 "Been There" (2000)
 "I'll Be Cool" (2002)
 "Once Again (2005)
 "Flaunt (2009)
 "Like That" (2012)
 "NO" (2015)
 "Love what we do" (2018) (with Sacx One)

Collaborative work 
Code Name: Scorpion (with Abstract Rude & Prevail)
 Code Name: Scorpion (2001) 
Dominant Mammals (with Kirby Dominant)
Dominant Mammals (2000)
Super Future Stars (2002)
Mr Mista (with Mr. Brady)
 The Bug Out EP (2012)
The J.M.B's (with Jon Rogers & Mr. Brady)
 JMB's Vol. 1 (2019)
The Nope (with Psy)
 Melba (2009)
 Rain All Day EP (2009) 
 Sinus EP (2014)
Nowfolk (with Ishkan)
 Style Gangsters (1999)
 Nowfolk 2: The Moon (2004)
 Magnesium Opium (unreleased 2003) (2016) 
 The Winter (unreleased 2001) (2016)
Perfect Strangers (with MadChild)
 Forefront EP (2001) 
The Rappers (with Jeff Spec)
 Rappin Atchu (1999)
Spacesuits (with Mr. Brady, LMNO & Jules Chaz)
 Spacesuits (2014)
Zzbra (with Evil Ebenezer)
 Zzbra: Original Motion Picture Soundtrack (2011)
Tank Gawd (produced by Kutmasta Kurt)
 Microphone Deflection EP (2020)

Guest appearances
Birdapres & RKV - "Now" (1997)
Isosceles - "All I Got" from Face the Music (1998)
Abstract Rude - "She's Always Right" (2001)
Pelding - "Lonewolf" from Pelding (2001)
Sweatshop Union - "Better Day" from Natural Progression (2003)
The A-Team - "Every Breath" from Lab Down Under (2003)
Fat Jack - "Warriors" from Cater to the DJ 2 (2004)
Abyssinian Creole - "Save As I Ever Was" from Sexy Beast (2005)
Planet Asia - "Time After Time" from The Sickness: Part One (2006)
Lenny Diko - "Nothing to Prove" (2006)
Joey Stylez - “Sikside” (2006)
Crunk23 - "Yeah" from Dirty Bling (2008)
Sweatshop Union - "Shoot Low" from Water Street (2008)
Dragon Fli Empire - "Paradise" from Redefine (2009)
Jennifer Abadesso - "Did You Think" from Expose (2010)
King Dylan - "I Still Fly" from Disheartened (2010)
Rushden & Diamonds - "Runway", "I'm Out" from 2010 (2010)
Factor - "Went Away" from Lawson Graham (2010)
Awol One & Factor - "The Wasp" from The Landmark (2011)
Young Kazh - “Money Up / Krazy World” (2011)
Sixo - "Paper Pathways" from Free Floating Rationales (2012)
Myka 9 & Factor - "Ode to Cosmosis" from Sovereign Soul (2012)
Muneshine - "Show Me the Money" (2012)
Dan-e-o - "Cherry On Top" from Immortal (2013)
Lord Diamonds - "Change of the Guard" (2014)
Matt Brevner - “Crashed” (2014)
CGB - "Senseless" from "Homegrown EP" Produced by Cubez (2016)
Dan-e-o - "League Of Legends" from Dear Hip Hop: 20 Years Later (2017)
DAYO - "Stay" (ft. Ishkan) from DAYO (2017)
Gabriel Teodros - "Liquid Sunshine 2.0" from History Rhymes If It Doesn't Repeat (A Southend Healing Ritual) (2018)
Monrabeatz - "Phases" (2021)Productions
Gabriel Teodros - "No Label" from Lovework (2007)
Dragon Fli Empire - "Day Job" from Intermission EP (2008)
Lil B - "Gods Father" from God's Father (mixtape) (2012)
Lord Diamonds - "Bentley Rolls", "Dom Henley", "Lamborghini Bikini Remix", "It's Addicting" & "Change The Knight" from Robert's Quest (2015)
Gabriel Teodros - History Rhymes If It Doesn't Repeat (A Southend Healing Ritual)'' (2018)

Awards 
Best Rap Recording (Swollen Members) 2001 Juno Award

Best Rap Recording (Swollen Members) 2002 Juno Award

Rap Recording of the Year (Swollen Members) 2003 Juno Award

2002 - MuchVIBE Best Rap Video ("Fuel Injected" feat. Moka Only and directed by Wendy Morgan)

2002 - MuchMusic Best Director ("Fuel Injected" feat. Moka Only and directed by Wendy Morgan)

2002 - MuchMusic VideoFACT Award ("Fuel Injected" feat. Moka Only and directed by Wendy Morgan)

2002 - MuchMusic Best Independent Video ("Fuel Injected" feat. Moka Only and directed by Wendy Morgan)

2003 - MuchVIBE Best Rap Video ("Breathe" feat. Nelly Furtado and directed by Todd McFarlane)

2002 - Canadian Radio Music Awards Breakthrough Artist ("Fuel Injected" feat. Moka Only)

2002 - West Coast Music Awards Best Urban Release (Bad Dreams)

2002 - The Georgia Straight Readers Choice Best Urban Act

2003 - COCA Campus Entertainment Awards Entertainer of the Year

2003 - Western Canadian Music Awards Outstanding Rap/Hip Hop Recording ("Monsters In The Closet")

2003 - Western Canadian Music Awards Outstanding Video ("Breathe" feat. Nelly Furtado)

Won the first ever RFR broadcast standards award.

Won "Most Fabulous Canadian Man" Award in 2009, given by Livia Murray Incorporated.

References

External links

urbnet.com/mokaonly
Cream Magazine interview
platform8470 interview, November 2006
platform8470 interview, June 2009
bio, July 2008

1973 births
Black Canadian musicians
Canadian hip hop record producers
Canadian male rappers
Living people
Musicians from British Columbia
People from the Capital Regional District
20th-century Canadian rappers
21st-century Canadian rappers
20th-century Canadian male musicians
21st-century Canadian male musicians